Ameya Anilkumar (born 5 January 2018), credited professionally as Baby Ameya, is an Indian child actress who predominantly works in Malayalam-language soap operas. She is well known for her role of Parukutty in the sitcom Uppum Mulakum aired on Flowers.

Early life
Ameya was born on 5 January 2018 in Prayer near Ochira in Kollam district of Kerala. Her father is Anil, is a vegetable vendor and her mother, Ganga Lakshmi is a housewife. She has an elder sister, Anikha and a younger brother, Aadhav.

Filmography

Television

References

2018 births
Actresses from Kollam
Indian child actresses
Living people
21st-century Indian actresses
Indian television actresses
Actresses in Malayalam television